Trotter Prize may refer to:

The Mildred Trotter Prize, an undergraduate anthropology award named for Mildred Trotter
The Trotter Prize (Texas A&M) an award for work on intelligent design